Asota speciosa, the specious tiger,  formerly Aganais speciosa, is a moth of the subfamily Aganainae, now regarded as being within the family Erebidae. Formerly it was regarded variously as a member of the Arctiidae, the Hypsidae, and subsequently the family Aganaidae, which was formerly regarded as a family by some authorities. The species is widespread in sub-Saharan Africa, such as in Sierra Leone, Togo, Nigeria, Cameroon, Mozambique and South Africa.

The larvae feed on certain latex-rich plants, mainly Ficus species (fig trees), both indigenous and domestic, but also on poisonous Acokanthera species. They sabotage the latex defences of their host plants by biting partway through the midrib, severing the latex vessels before proceeding to feed on the portion of the leaf blade distal to the sabotage, which is no longer supplied with latex.

References

Asota (moth)
Moths of Africa
Moths described in 1773
Taxa named by Dru Drury